John Tejada (born 21 April 1974) is an Austrian-born American electronic music producer and composer. Tejada's output of music began in 1994, including four albums for Kompakt, plus releases on Pokerflat, Cocoon, Plug Research, Seventh City, Playhouse, Defected, and his own label of 22 years, Palette Recordings.

Early life
Tejada was born on 21 April 1974 in Vienna, Austria, and moved to Los Angeles in 1982 with his parents, both classically trained professional musicians. After learning the piano at age 4 and drums at age 8, Tejada was introduced to hip-hop music, and at age 12 received his first turntable and mixer. His first gig was that same year, when he began DJing the school dances. By 1991, he was already creating his own recordings, and in 1994 he released a single with Arian Leviste.

Disc jockey career
Tejada began traveling internationally in 1997 to showcase his DJing skills around the globe. He has traveled to more than 25 countries and performed live at clubs and festivals around the world, including the Detroit Electronic Music Festival (aka Movement), Sónar (in Spain and Tokyo), Decibel Festival (Seattle), Dance Valley (Netherlands), Sync Festival (Greece), Mutek (Montreal and Mexico), as well as internationally known spaces such as Berghain (Berlin), Fabric (London), Yellow (Tokyo), Rex Club (Paris), Output (NYC), Dekmantel (Amsterdam), Guggenheim (Bilbao), The Dorothy Chandler Pavilion (Los Angeles), and twice at Walt Disney Concert Hall in Los Angeles.

Collaborations
Tejada has also been responsible for remixing dozens of acts including The Postal Service, Télépopmusic, The Field, Bomb the Bass, Way Out West, Kevin Saunderson, Darren Emerson, Gui Boratto, and Simian Mobile Disco. Tejada's latest venture is as Wajatta (with international star Reggie Watts) with their debut album being released on May 11, 2018.

Discography

Albums
Little Green Lights and Four Inch Faders (1998) - A13
The Matrix of Us (2000) - Defocus
Daydreams In Cold Weather (2002) - Plug Research
The Toiling of Idle Hands (2003) - Immigrant Records
Logic Memory Center (2004) - Plug Research
Cleaning Sound is a Filthy Business (2006) - Palette Recordings
Where (2008) - Palette Recordings
Parabolas (2011) - Kompakt
The Predicting Machine (2012) - Kompakt
Signs Under Test (2015) - Kompakt
Dead Start Program (2018) - Kompakt
Live Rytm Trax (2018) - Palette
Year of the Living Dead (2021) - Kompakt

EPs
Ebonics (1997) - Palette Recordings
Genre (1998) - Palette Recordings
Sonic Life (1998) - Ferox Records
Song Forms & Freedom (2000) - Mosaic
The Cover Up (2000) - 1200 Music
Connection Remixes (2001) - Sheep Records
Mating Rhythm (2001) - MosaicThe Toiling of Idle Hands (2004) - ImmigrantVoyager (2005) - Palette RecordingsSweat (On the Walls) (2005) - Poker Flat RecordingsNot That, But This (2011) - TrapezAcid Test 10 (2016) - Absurd RecordingsTherapy (2016) - Palette RecordingsAcid Test 12 (2017) - Absurd Recordings

Compilation albumsFabric 44 - John Tejada (2009) - Fabric (London)The 7th City Years (2012) - Palette Recordings

Collaborative albums
WajattaCasual High Technology (2018) - Comedy DynamicsDon't Let Get You Down'' (2020) - Brainfeeder

References

External links
Palette Recordings

RBMA Radio On Demand - Train Wreck Mix - John Tejada (Palette Rec., LA)
  Interview John Tejada - Actualites Electroniques
  Interview John Tejada - Actualites Electroniques

1974 births
Living people
Austrian electronic musicians
Plug Research artists